Lake Kömüşini, also known as Lake Uyuz, ( or Uyuz Gölü) is a freshwater lake in Konya Province, Turkey.

The lake is located in Kömüşini village to the north of Kulu ilçe (district) in Konya Province, central Turkey. It is fed by groundwater.

The shores of the lake are covered with reeds. Wheat fields surround the lake. The lake is an important breeding place for waders. It is a habitat for black-necked grebe, ferruginous duck and coot. It host also diverse bird species during the migration periods. 

The lake and its surroundings were granted a special protected area status due to the population of world-wide endangered species white-headed duck, which breeds here. In 1992, the site was declared a nature protected area.

The reed fields around the lake suffers from the frequent fires of obscure origin. A bush fire completely devastated the reeds in 2005.

References

Komusini
Komusini
Wetlands of Turkey
Bird sanctuaries of Turkey
Kulu, Konya
Important Bird Areas of Turkey